Lucien-Samir Oulahbib (born 1956, in Aïn El Hammam, Tizi Ouzou, Algeria) is a French sociologist, political scientist, writer and journalist who taught at the University Lyon 3, from 2007 until 2019. He taught at the University Paris X from 2005 to 2007 and now teaches at Albert le Grand Institute. He manages Dogma philosophy journal together with Isabelle Saillot.

His writings tackle contemporary French nihilism, radical Islamism, anti-Americanism, and antisemitism. Lucien Oulabib's scientific interests range from sociology, political philosophy, philosophy of law, geopolitics, international relations, communication and information philosophy to theology and nihilism.

Early life 
Lucien-Samir Oulahbib was born in 1956 in northern Algeria into a Berber Christian family. In 1956, a family with a newborn child emigrated to France and in 1969 reintegrated French citizenship. His father was the head of a construction company, and his mother was a kindergarten teacher. Lucien is a supporter of the Berber movement defends Berber cultural roots against Arab dominance and many of his works are devoted to this topic.

Education 
L.-S. Oulahbib holds a master's degree in sociology and economics from the Paris Nanterre University (1984) under the direction of Jean Baudrillard; M.A.S. (1985) under the direction of Jean Baechler (Paris IV Sorbonne), François Bourricaud (Paris IV) and Alain Besançon (EHESS).

PhD in historical sociology (Paris IV Sorbonne, 1997): "Murderers of Man: contemporary nihilism in France" under the direction of professor Jean Baechler. Habilitation to conduct research in political science (Lyon III, 2007): “Evaluation of the form of politics in the democratic era", under the direction of professor Jean Paul Joubert.

Career 
Oulahbib was a host at the free radio Canal 75 and was a reporter, an editor of Magazine Sans Nom, Citizen K, Technikart, and worked as a freelance journalist for Esprit Critique, Dogma, Marianne and Tumulte.

Since 2000 he teaches political science, sociology, moral and political philosophy, geopolitics, international relations, communication, media and public opinion analysis at the Jean Moulin University Lyon 3. Lucien Oulahbib's research interests have a wide range from sociology and political philosophy to theology and nihilism.  He devotes much attention to the analysis of the philosophy of French nihilism: Bataille, Blanchot, Foucault, Derrida, Deleuze, Lyotard, Baudrillard, Bourdieu which he calls "anti-rational nihilism" for their desire to prevent an understanding of the world.

He was influenced by a French thinker Jean Baudrillard, who was his scientific supervisor and later became a close friend. Lucien believes that the book The Consumer Society by Baudrillard is one of the groundbreaking works which is relevant even today. Since 2020, Oulahbib has been teaching Reading workshops: "The consumer society of Jean Baudrillard"  at the Le Collège Supérieur (Lyon).

Publications 

 Ethique Et Épistémologie du Nihilisme: les Meurtriers du Sens.  L'Harmattan. 2002, 399 p.
 Le Nihilisme Français Contemporain Fondements Et Illustrations. L'Harmattan. 2003, 164 p.
 La philosophie cannibale: la théorie du mensonge, de la mutilation, ou l'appropriation totalitaire chez Derrida, Deleuze, Foucault, Lyotard. La Table Ronde. 2006, 218 p.
 Méthode d'évaluation du développement humain. L'Harmattan. 2006, 176 p.
 Le monde arabe existe-t-il ? : Histoire paradoxale des Berbères. Éditions de Paris, 2007, 214 p.
 Actualité de Pierre Janet : En quoi est-il plus important que Freud pour les sciences morales et politiques. L'Harmattan. 2009, 268 p.
 Le politiquement correct français: épistémologie d'une crypto-religion. L'Harmattan. 2012, 152 p.

References

External links 

 Official site
 Lucien-Samir Oulahbib at L'Harmattan
 Lucien-Samir Oulahbib at the University Lyon 3

1956 births
People from Ain El Hammam
21st-century French philosophers
French sociologists
French male writers
French political scientists
French people of Berber descent
Berber Christians
Berber writers
Academic staff of the University of Lyon
University of Paris alumni
Paris-Sorbonne University alumni
Living people